The Pakistan national cricket team toured the West Indies from March to April 1988 and played a three-match Test series and five-match ODI series against the West Indies cricket team which was drawn 1–1.

The tour started with the ODI leg where Pakistan were thrashed by 5/0 despite missing services of Viv Richards due to injury concerns who was perhaps finest batter in world at the time. However, Pakistan staged a brilliant comeback in the test leg of the tour & came closest to end West Indies undefeated record in a test series for 15 years.

In first test at Boruda Stadium in Georgetown in absence of Viv Richards and Malcolm Marshall, Windies were led by the opener Gordon Greenidge suffered their first test defeat at home in ten years after their Packer depleted team lost to Australia at same venue in 1978. Imran Khan coming out of the retirement took an 11 wicket haul in the game along with Miandad's first test century against Windies, Pakistan defeat them by 9 wickets. However, In second test at Trinidad, Viv Richards returned along with Marshall and rescued West Indies batting from 80/4 by scoring his 22nd test ton. Richards also passed 7,000 test runs during the innings and became third fastest to the milestone in 140 innings at the time after Walter Hammond and Garfield Sobers. However, Pakistan managed to secure a draw in the game by a slim margin of 1 wicket through the last stand.

In final game at Barbaods, West Indies managed to win the test by 1 wicket and thus level the series by 1/1 continuing their unbeaten record. The series is widely regarded as among the finest test series of all time.

Test series summary

First Test

Second Test

Third Test

One Day Internationals (ODIs)

West Indies won the series 5-0.

1st ODI

2nd ODI

3rd ODI

4th ODI

5th ODI

References

External links

1988 in Pakistani cricket
1988 in West Indian cricket
Pakistani cricket tours of the West Indies
International cricket competitions from 1985–86 to 1988
West Indian cricket seasons from 1970–71 to 1999–2000